A deaf superhero is a fictional character who is deaf and who usually has abilities beyond those of normal deaf human beings.

List of deaf superheroes

See also
Deaf culture
Sign language

References 

Fictional deaf characters
Deaf